A list of films produced in Spain in 1972 (see 1972 in film).

1972

External links
 Spanish films of 1972 at the Internet Movie Database

1972
Spanish
Films